Stanislav Štrunc (30 October 1942 – 8 November 2001) was a Czech football player. His playing position was right winger.

Štrunc started his football career in his native Plzeň, where his football club Škoda Plzeň (today Viktoria Plzeň) elevated him to the role of a prolific goalscorer of the Czechoslovak First League. In 1965 he moved to Dukla Prague, to serve his military service, and played there until 1972. He scored 65 league goals for Dukla in that era. Štrunc won the First League with Dukla in 1966. In 1966 and 1969 he also won the Czechoslovak Cup with Dukla. Afterwards Štrunc returned to Plzeň and played professionally until 1977. He retired from top football one week after scoring his 100th league goal in 329 matches.

Internationally Štrunc played for Czechoslovakia and represented his country at the 1968 Summer Olympics in Mexico. He made three appearances for the national team, all of which were during his time as a Dukla Prague player.

Štrunc is perceived as a legendary player at Viktoria Plzeň. Since 2004 the youth international football tournament named after him is held by Viktoria.

References

Cited texts

External links
 Profile at Hall of Fame Dukla Praha 
 

1942 births
2001 deaths
Czech footballers
Czechoslovak footballers
Czechoslovakia international footballers
Olympic footballers of Czechoslovakia
Footballers at the 1968 Summer Olympics
FC Viktoria Plzeň players
Dukla Prague footballers
Sportspeople from Plzeň
Association football forwards